The Philip Morris Blended Leaf Complex Historic District encompasses a complex of tobacco storage and processing facilities at 2301 Maury Street in Richmond, Virginia.  Included in the  site are a series of warehouses and cigarette-making factories developed beginning in the 1950s.  Philip Morris USA built this complex in part to capitalize on advances in machinery that greatly increased the production speed of cigarettes.

The complex was listed on the National Register of Historic Places in 2017.

See also
National Register of Historic Places listings in Richmond, Virginia

References

Industrial buildings and structures on the National Register of Historic Places in Virginia
Industrial buildings completed in 1952
Buildings and structures in Richmond, Virginia
National Register of Historic Places in Richmond, Virginia
Warehouses on the National Register of Historic Places
Tobacco buildings in the United States
Historic districts in Virginia